Little Shasta is an unincorporated community in Siskiyou County, California.

See also
Little Shasta Church - A church in the town

References

Unincorporated communities in Siskiyou County, California
Unincorporated communities in California